Hosne Ara Lutfa Dalia is Bangladesh Awami League politician and Member of Parliament.

Biography
Hosne Ara Lutfa Dalia was born on 1 January 1963 in Rangpur City, Rangpur District, East Pakistan, Pakistan. She completed her studies in law, finishing school with an LLB degree and start her law practise. On 1 January 2006 she presided over a conference tittled Combating Violence against Women. The conference was held by Padakhep, a non-government organisation based in Rangpur, in Rangpur Chamber of Commerce and Industry auditorium. She previously served as the President of Rangpur Nattya Chakra, a cultural organisation which promotes theatre and other cultural activities. She was nominated on 8 March 2014 by Bangladesh Awami League to the Parliament through the reserved seats for women. She was elected on 19 March 2014 as one of forty-eight females Members of Parliament elected unopposed. She is a Member of the treasury bench of the parliament. She has spoken for the rights of Dalits and spoken for the passage of the draft on Elimination of discrimination act-2015 through the Bangladesh Parliament. She is a Member of the Parliamentary Caucus on Children Rights.

References

Awami League politicians
Living people
Women members of the Jatiya Sangsad
1963 births
10th Jatiya Sangsad members
21st-century Bangladeshi women politicians